The year 2004 is the tenth year in the history of Fighting Network Rings, a mixed martial arts promotion based in Japan. In 2004 Fighting Network Rings held 4 events beginning with, Rings Holland: World's Greatest.

Events list

Rings Holland: World's Greatest

Rings Holland: World's Greatest was an event held on April 4, 2004 at the Alytus Sports Hall in Alytus, Alytus County, Lithuania.

Results

Rings Holland: Two Heroes, One Winner

Rings Holland: Two Heroes, One Winner was an event held on October 3, 2004 at the Alytus Sports Hall in Alytus, Alytus County, Lithuania.

Results

Rings Holland: Local Heroes 2

Rings Holland: Local Heroes 2 was an event held on October 30, 2004 at the Alytus Sports Hall in Alytus, Alytus County, Lithuania.

Results

Rings Holland: Born Invincible

Rings Holland: Born Invincible was an event held on December 12, 2004 at the Alytus Sports Hall in Alytus, Alytus County, Lithuania.

Results

See also 
 Fighting Network Rings
 List of Fighting Network Rings events

References

Fighting Network Rings events
2004 in mixed martial arts